Myrtartona rufiventris is a species of moth in the family Zygaenidae. It is found in Western Australia, South Australia and Victoria.

The forewings are blackish brown with scattered whitish scales. The hindwings are elliptical, dark grey-brown, but paler proximally.

Adults have been reported exhibiting thanatosis when disturbed.

The larvae feed on Melaleuca lanceolata.

References

Moths described in 1854
Endemic fauna of Australia
Procridinae